Flex-Able Leftovers was a limited edition 10" vinyl EP by American composer and guitarist, Steve Vai. It was leftover material from the recordings done during the "Flex-Able" days (1982 to 1984) and originally released in 1984 (see 1984 in music). In this regard, it can be perceived as a supplement to the initial release of "Flex-Able". As in the case of the main album, "Flex-Able Leftovers" boast of a Zappa-based stylistic and musical influence.

Background 

There were only two EP editions in 1984:

 The first issue (limited to 1,000 copies) on Urantia Records.
 The second issue, with a different cover artwork/design (limited to 1,000 copies) on Akashic Records.

Subsequently, the EP was re-released as a studio album with more tracks in November 1998.

Track listing 

All songs written by Steve Vai, except where noted.

In Side
"You Didn't Break It" (Bob Harris, Suzannah Harris) – 4:14
"Bledsoe Bluvd" – 4:22
"The Beast of Love" (Joe Kearney) – 3:29
"Burnin' Down the Mountain" – 4:22
Out Side
"So Happy" (Vai, Laurel Fishman) – 2:43
"Details at 10" – 5:57
"Little Pieces of Seaweed" (Vai, Larry Kutcher) – 5:12
"Chronic Insomnia" – 2:00

Credits

Personnel 

 Steve Vai – vocals, acoustic and electric guitars, coral sitar, keyboards, electric piano, bass guitar, background vocals
 Scott Collard – Synthesizer (Prophet V)
 Larry Crane – piccolo xylophone, bell lyre, vibraphone
 Fammin – vocals (screaming)
 Laurel Fishman – vocals
 Chris Frazier – drums
 Joe Kearney – vocals
 Larry Kutcher – vocals (narration) and lyrics (for Little Pieces Of Seaweed)
 Stu Hamm – vocals, bass guitar
 Suzannah Harris – background vocals
 Bob Harris – vocals programmed by drums
 Tommy Mars – vocals, violin, keyboards
 Lillian Vai – vocals (crying)
 Chad Wackerman – drums
 Pete Zeldman – percussion

Technical contributions 

 Steve Vai – producer, engineer, mixing, cover artwork/cover design
 John Matousek – mastering
 Mark Pinske – mastering (assistant)

References 

Steve Vai albums
1984 EPs
Progressive rock EPs
Instrumental rock EPs